Project Runway Season 12 is the twelfth season of the television show Project Runway, appearing on Lifetime. The season began airing on July 18, 2013 with 15 designers competing to become "the next great American designer." Kate Pankoke, a designer from Season 11 returned to compete once again for the grand prize.  Pankoke was voted back by fans in an online poll, winning against Ra'mon Lawrence Coleman of Season 6, and Valerie Mayen of Season 8.

Supermodel Heidi Klum, Marie Claire creative director Nina Garcia, and fashion designer Zac Posen all returned as judges this season. Tim Gunn returned as the workroom mentor. This was also the first season to feature the "Tim Gunn save," which gave Gunn the opportunity to bring an eliminated designer back into the competition if he disagreed with the judges.

Belk was the exclusive retail sponsor for Project Runway's 12th season and has merchandised the accessory wall with an assortment of products.

In 2014, Alexandria von Bromssen, Kate Pankoke, Justin LeBlanc and Helen Castillo competed in the fourth season of Project Runway All Stars, with Alexandria placing 13th, Kate placing 11th, Justin placing 7th and Helen placing 3rd.  In 2016, Alexander Pope, Ken Laurence and Dom Streater competed in the fifth season of All Stars, with Alexander placing 8th, Ken placing 3rd and Dom winning the competition. Helen Castillo and Ken Laurence would later reappear in Project Runway All Stars (season 6) where Helen placed 6th and Ken placed 4th.

Designers
Sources:

*Kate Pankoke, designer in Project Runway (season 11), was voted back by fans to this season.

Designer Progress

Scores are based on the Project Runway website
: Miranda originally had one of the higher scores, however the judges reconsidered their scores since she had not used enough of the challenge material (the parachute) for her dress. She was told that, despite her outfit being good, she did not follow the rules. Therefore, she could be disqualified and eliminated from the competition.
: Before leaving the runway, Heidi told Helen she was very lucky to have had immunity that week or she could have been in the bottom two and/or out. Nina also said that she questioned Helen's win, stating she now thinks it might've all been Kate's help, who was partnered with her on the previous challenge.
: Because Sandro was missing all three of the lowest-scoring designers (Miranda, Jeremy, and Sue) were safe.
: Before leaving the runway, Heidi told Alexander, Bradon and Miranda that they were close to being the winning team.
: Dom was initially called in the bottom along with Jeremy and Ken. However, the bottom three designers were given an extra hour in the workroom to make alterations to their outfit or redesign a new one. The judges gave Dom's second dress such high marks that it was named the second winner of the challenge.

the designer won Project Runway Season 12.
 The designer was advanced to Fashion Week.
 
 designer won the challenge.

the designer had the second highest scores.
 the designer had one of the highest scores for that challenge, but did not win.
 the designer had one of the lowest scores for that challenge, but was not eliminated.
 the designer was in the bottom two, but was not eliminated.
  the designer lost and was eliminated from the competition.
 The designer withdrew from the competition.
 The designer lost, but was saved from elimination by Tim Gunn.

 The model won Project Runway Season 12.
 The model wore the winning design that challenge.
 The model wore the design with the second highest scores.
 The model wore the design with one of the highest scores.
 The model wore the design that had one of the lowest scores.
 The model wore the design that landed in the bottom two.
 The model wore the losing design that challenge.
 The model was eliminated.
In episode 10, the models were not needed in the challenge.

Models
Rayuana Aleyce
Ya Bi
Ji Young Baek
Cameron Corrigan
Molly Fletcher
Roberta Little
Laura O'Neall
Nastasia Ohl
Briana Holmer
Shaya Ali
Liliana Nova
Jessica Solis
Viktoria Pleshakova
Sophie Lloyd
Jillian Billingham
Sierra Illig

Designer Legend
Alexander Pope: AP
Alexandria von Bromssen: AV
Angela Bacskocky: AB
Bradon McDonald: BM
Dom Streater: DS
Helen Castillo: HC
Jeremy Brandrick: JB
Justin LeBlanc: JL
Kahindo Mateene: KM
Karen Batts: KB
Kate Pankoke: KP
Ken Laurence: KL
Miranda Kay Levy: ML
Sandro Masmanidi: SM
Sue Waller: SW
Timothy Westbrook: TW

Episodes

Episode 1: Sky's The Limit 
Original airdate: July 18, 2013

In the Season 12 opener, the designers arrive on an airport runway and then must create looks from parachute materials. Kate Pankoke from Season 11 was voted to come on the show by fans.
 Guest Judge: Kate Bosworth
 WINNER: Bradon
 ELIMINATED: Angela

Episode 2: Million Dollar Runway 
Original airdate: July 25, 2013

 Designers create looks paired with precious jewels.
 Guest Judge: Eric Daman
 WINNER: Kate
 ELIMINATED: Kahindo

Episode 3: An Unconventional Coney Island 
Original airdate: August 1, 2013

 Working in pairs, designers must give away samples of frozen yogurt while asking the samplers for words to describe the yogurt. The pairs must choose three of the words as inspiration for their designs and then create an outfit using unconventional materials won by playing carnival games at Coney Island.
Teams
Alexander and Justin
Alexandria and Dom
Bradon and Karen
Helen and Kate
Jeremy and Ken
Miranda and Timothy
Sandro and Sue

 Guest Judge: Kelly Osbourne
 WINNER: Helen
 ELIMINATED: Timothy

Episode 4: Tie the Knot 
Original airdate: August 8, 2013

 The contestants must create a look incorporating bow ties provided by Tie The Knot organization.
 Guest Judge: Jesse Tyler Ferguson
 WINNER: Bradon
 WITHDREW: Sandro
 Despite being safe from elimination, Sandro got into a fight with Zac Posen on the runway about his design. He then went back to the waiting room and got into a verbal altercation with Helen and Ken, at which point he stormed out. Tim Gunn informed the judges that Sandro was missing, which led to all three of the lowest-scoring designers (Miranda, Jeremy, and Sue) being safe. Sandro later apologized to Helen and Ken for his behavior during the next challenge before he went home.

Episode 5: YOU Choose Your Materials! 
Original airdate: August 15, 2013

 Working in small teams, the designers have to use items from two of three retailers as their material to create a luxurious collection. The stores were a vintage wallpaper store, a party supply/homewares store, and a food market.

 Guest Judge: June Ambrose
 WINNER: Jeremy
 ELIMINATED: Sue

Episode 6: Let's Go Glamping! 
Original airdate: August 22, 2013

 The designers go on a luxury overnight camping trip, with campsite surroundings serving as style inspirations for this challenge.
 Guest Judge: Allison Williams
 WINNER:  Alexandria
 SAVED: Justin

Episode 7: Shoes First! 
Original airdate: August 29, 2013

 The designers have to create a look inspired by shoes from the Marie Claire shoe closet.
 Guest Judge: Kaley Cuoco & Anne Fulenwider
 WINNER:  Helen
 ELIMINATED: Miranda

Episode 8: Having a Field Day 
Original airdate: September 5, 2013

 The designers have to create a high-end performance wear for Heidi Klum's New Balance line, but the challenge time is not the same for everyone as they have to display their athleticism skills to earn some extra working time. Dom and Justin both won one extra hour of work because of their athletic skills.
 Guest Judge: Michael Kors
 WINNER: Helen
 ELIMINATED: Karen

Episode 9: Let's Do Brunch 
Original airdate: September 12, 2013

 The designers have to create a vibrant look for the Belk shopper, a modern southern woman. The winning look will be sold in Belk Shops and online. Dom, Ken & Jeremy were all the bottom and the judges decided to give them one hour to change or make their garments into stunning pieces.
 Guest Judge: Stacy Keibler & John Thomas
 WINNERS: Bradon & Dom
 ELIMINATED: Jeremy

Episode 10: Project Runway SuperFan! 
Original airdate: September 19, 2013

 The designers have to create a look for the Project Runway SuperFan!
 Guest Judge: Zanna Roberts Rassi & Erin Fetherston
Zanna was sitting in for Nina 
 WINNER: Helen
 ELIMINATED: Ken

Episode 11: Next Generation... 
Original airdate: September 26, 2013

 The designers get their inspiration from young next generation personalities, who are making a difference.
 Guest Judge: Peter Som
 WINNER: Dom
 ELIMINATED: Alexander & Kate

Episode 12: Butterfly Effect 
Original airdate: October 3, 2013

 The designers are on pins and needles when they're affected by a previous double elimination. In a fashion test, they must take a risk and spin out an avant-garde look inspired by butterflies. As a twist, and for the first time ever on Project Runway, the designers are given a second "make it work" challenge: to take a previous losing look from the season and transform it into a winning look.
 Guest Judge: Emmy Rossum
 WINNER:  Bradon
 ELIMINATED:  None

Episode 13: Finale, Part 1 
Original airdate: October 10, 2013

 In Part 1 of the two-part Season 12 finale, the remaining designers journey home to work on their lines, with Tim Gunn paying them visits.
 Guest Judge: None
 ADVANCED: Bradon, Dom, Justin, Alexandria
 ELIMINATED: Helen

Episode 14: Finale, Part 2 
Original airdate: October 17, 2013

 The finalists present their collections at Lincoln Center. The winner of Project Runway Season 12 is announced.
 Guest Judge: Kerry Washington
 WINNER: Dom
 ELIMINATED: Alexandria, Justin and Bradon

Episode 15: Reunion Special 
''Original airdate: October 24, 2013

After the Finale, the designers reunite to discuss their journey on Project Runway.

References

External links 

Season 12
2013 American television seasons
2013 in fashion